was a quarterly yuri manga magazine published by Ichijinsha. The first issue was published on June 18, 2007. It was the sister magazine of Comic Yuri Hime. The contributors were mostly shōnen and seinen manga authors. The magazine is aimed at male readers, and included moe elements. In 2010 it was merged with Comic Yuri Hime.

Serialized manga
Cassiopeia Dolce
Honey Crush
Flower Flower
Konohana Kitan
Konohana Link
Marriage Black
Minus Literacy
Nanami to Misuzu
Otomeiro StayTune
Otome Kikan Gretel (discontinued)
Wife and Wife
YuruYuri

References

External links
 Comic Yuri Hime S' official website 
 Readership data for Comic Yuri Hime S 

2007 establishments in Japan
2010 disestablishments in Japan
Defunct magazines published in Japan
Quarterly manga magazines published in Japan
Ichijinsha magazines
Magazines established in 2007
Magazines disestablished in 2010
Men's magazines published in Japan
Shōnen manga magazines
Seinen manga magazines
Yuri (genre) manga magazines